Thomas Cornelius Hunter (10 November 1883 – 11 March 1932) was a militant Irish republican. He was a member of the Irish Republican Brotherhood (IRB), Sinn Féin, the Irish Volunteers, was twice elected to the Irish parliament, Dáil Éireann, and fought against the forces of the Irish Free State as a member of the Irish Republican Army during the Irish Civil War. While not widely known today, he was present at or directly involved in several major incidents during the struggle for Irish independence from the United Kingdom of Great Britain and Ireland.

Early life
Hunter was born in 1883 in the village of Castletownroche, County Cork in Ireland, son of Con Hunter, a baker, and his wife Ellen (née Hayes) of Glanworth. In 1907, he moved to Dublin to begin his apprenticeship as a draper. He soon joined Conradh na Gaeilge and came under the influence of Thomas Clarke. He was a close friend to Con Colbert (after whom he would name his only child) and William T. Cosgrave.

IRB and the Irish Volunteers
It did not take long for him to find his way into the IRB. By 1910, he was a member of the Henry Joy McCracken Circle, which was based out of 41 Parnell Square on Dublin's northside. This Circle, or cell, was attached to the Munitions Section and focused mainly on the procurement of small arms. Between 1911 and 1912, Hunter became the "Centre" of the Circle. As a Centre, one of his duties was to visit other Circles and deliver various military lectures. He did this frequently with Con Colbert, who was Centre for another Circle. Hunter would remain Centre of this Circle right up to the 1916 Easter Rising.

At the creation of the Irish Volunteers in November 1913, Hunter was immediately made Vice-Commandant of the 2nd Battalion Dublin Brigade, under Thomas MacDonagh. The good soldier, he would serve as either Commandant, Vice-Commandant or Captain as the situation required. While this was an endless source of confusion for the rank-and-file Volunteers, they all knew that they only needed to find Hunter and he would lead them on. He was well-liked and respected by the men under his command. Such was the confusion that Peter Paul Galligan, a member of Hunter's IRB Circle and a soldier in the 2nd Battalion, was unsure if Hunter was Commandant or not.

The 2nd Battalion was ordered to march, on 26 July 1914, to Howth to assist in the delivery of 900 rifles and ammunition being landed by Erskine Childers aboard his yacht, Asgard. While it is not clear if Hunter was on the march or involved in the landing, he was heavily involved in the subsequent recollection of the scattered rifles and the more orderly distribution and safe storage of the same. This was in line with his experience as an IRB Centre with years of experience in procuring and distributing arms.

On 1 August 1914, Hunter, now teamed up with his long-time partner Peadar Clancy, took part in the Kilcoole gun-running, in which 600 rifles and ammunition were landed in County Wicklow.

The Redmondite Split of the Volunteers, in September 1914, thrust Hunter even further into the realm of the IRB elite. With the departure of Bulmer Hobson from the IRB Supreme Council, Hunter was appointed to the body. For reasons unknown, he attended only one meeting and resigned his seat to Sean Tobin. It is also at this time that MacDonagh moved to the Dublin Brigade Command, thereby leaving Hunter as de facto Commandant of the 2nd Battalion. The split saw around 75% of the members of the Volunteers follow John Redmond and the Irish Parliamentary Party into the ranks of the British military and The Great War. Those that remained were committed and had full confidence in their leaders. This attitude was summed up by Professor Liam Ó Briain: At last we had a real body with a real purpose. Organisation was improved by able leaders like Thomas MacDonagh, of the Dublin Brigade, and Brigade-Adjutant Éamon de Valera; Ned Daly and Piaras Béaslaí in the first battalions; Tom Hunter, Eamon Price, and Richard Mulcahy in the second, Eamon Ceannt and Cathal Brugha in the fourth.

Easter Rising and internment
Late in 1915, the Military Council of the IRB set the date of The Rising as Easter Sunday. This information was not made available to anyone other than the members of that sub-committee, and especially not the IRB Supreme Council leader, Eoin MacNeill. With the date set and the wheels starting to be in motion, there remained one further obstacle that may have spoiled their plans. James Connolly, leader of the Irish Citizens Army, was making noise that he would strike the first blow before the Irish Volunteers and the IRB. In order to quiet him down, and put off imminent arrests by Dublin Castle, a meeting was arranged on 19 January between Connolly and several of the Military Council members, including Patrick Pearse, Tom Clarke, Éamonn Ceannt, Seán Mac Diarmada and Joseph Plunkett. This meeting, in a home in Dolphin's Barn, lasted for three days. By its end on 22 January, Connolly had become convinced to quiet down on publicly calling for a rising, committed his Citizens Army to the plans and timeline developed by the IRB Military Council, was sworn into the IRB and posted to the Military Council. During all this time, none of Connolly’s people knew where he was. Upon his return, he remained tight-lipped about it all, including to his close friends and his wife. Various stories emerged, including those of his kidnapping by the IRB and his saying he had simply gone “walking in the country”.

The details of these meetings appeared to have been shared within the upper ranks of the Volunteers very quickly. On 19 January, Hunter was observed, by the Dublin Metropolitan Police (DMP), attending an 8PM meeting at the Irish Volunteers Headquarters, 2 Dawson Street. Other attendees included Eoin MacNeill, Herbert ‘Barney’ Mellows, Eoin O'Duffy, Michael J. O'Rahilly, Patrick Pearse, Thomas MacDonagh, Joseph McGuinness, Joseph O'Connor, Joseph Plunkett, Éamon De Valera, Seán Mac Diarmada, Bulmer Hobson, Eamonn Ceannt, JJ "Ginger" O'Connell, Sean Fitzgibbon, Piaras Béaslaí, Con Colbert and Thomas McCarthy. Hunter is further identified in the report as working as a Draper’s Assistant at Pim’s Department Store and a Captain in the Volunteers. This meeting was significant in that five of the seven Signatories of the Proclamation were present. The missing two were Connolly and Clarke. Additionally, nearly everyone present would become notable in 20th Century Irish history.

On 21 January, Hunter was observed again by the DMP attending another evening meeting at the Volunteer headquarters. The other meeting attendees were Éamon de Valera, Joseph McGuinness, Michael O'Hanrahan, JJ "Ginger" O'Connell, Con Colbert and Thomas MacDonagh.

With MacDonagh more and more involved with the Military Council and Brigade, by St. Patrick's Day, 1916, the entirety of the 2nd Battalion was understood to be under Hunter's command. The confusion around his being Commandant or Vice-Commandant continued, but he was beyond doubt the O.C. MacDonagh's extended absences due to IRB Military Council and Irish Volunteers Brigade Command activities were the root of all this confusion. Oscar Traynor, who rose through the ranks from Lieutenant to Brigadier of the Dublin Brigade, eventually becoming a  Teachta Dála for 25 years, had this to say about the situation in his official Witness Statement, given in January 1950: Tom Hunter was still Vice-Commandant, as far as the volunteers were concerned, but it was never announced that MacDonagh was not the Commandant. He was always regarded as being Commandant of the 2nd Battalion, and even to this present day there seems to be doubt as to whether Thomas MacDonagh was ever Brigadier of the Dublin Brigade. I am almost certain that he was.
The Rising was originally set for noon on Easter Sunday. Most of the rank-and-file Volunteers were unaware that anything unusual was afoot, as The Rising was planned in secret by the IRB Military Council. Many may have suspected that something was in the offing when they received orders to mobilize with full-gear and rations for three-days of maneuvers and drills, but very few would have known the extent that these "maneuvers" would take. The secret, however, was soon out after Bulmer Hobson learned of it at an IRB Centre meeting on the evening before Good Friday. 
There are two versions to the story of Hobson's subsequent arrest. The first is that he left the IRB meeting and went directly to report the news of The Rising to Eoin MacNeill, Chief of Staff for the Irish Volunteers. MacNeill immediately issued countermanding orders to the Volunteers across the island that all maneuvers were off. The IRB Military Council issued orders for Hobson's arrest before he could cause more confusion.  One of the leading men sent to apprehend him was Hunter. The other version is that the decision to arrest Hobson was made on the Monday before his IRB Centre meeting. In either case, these countermanding orders, obviously, threw the months of planning into chaos and, other than the Dublin Brigade, few Volunteer groups across Ireland rose in any significant way.

After spending most of Friday and into Saturday night keeping guard over Hobson, Hunter was at Liberty Hall with James Connolly early on Easter Sunday morning. The emotions of those in the building were obviously raw. While the Military Council dealt with the fall-out and replanning for rising the next day, Hunter was soon busy on the streets of Dublin, organizing and directing the Volunteers. From Father Mathew Park in the suburb of Fairview, Hunter spent most of the day dispatching bicycle messengers to inform the Volunteers to stand ready in their homes and to await further orders. At 7 o'clock Sunday evening, he stopped by the home of Tom Slater. Slater was Hunter's Adjutant in the 2nd Battalion. Together they walked to the Jacob's Biscuit Factory, being joined by Lt. Leo Henderson along the way. As they were on this roughly hour-long walk to Jacob's, Hunter informed the two that there was definitely something planned for the next day, that they would be located in this section of the city and that Hunter wanted to get a better look at the place. Once they had investigated the area, they then walked the hour back to the north side of the city. Hunter then left the other two and went to meet MacDonagh to discuss what he saw.

Between 6am and 7am on Easter Monday, Hunter was back in Father Mathew Park, issuing orders and dispatches via bicycle messengers. This time the orders were to mobilize at Father Mathew Park in time to be at St Stephen's Green by 10am. The Volunteers were to draw as little attention to themselves as possible, not to march in formation and, as much as possible, to simple “appear” at Stephen's Green. As the morning wore on and more and more men reported, the orders were changed to simply make for Stephen's Green, skipping Father Mathew Park altogether. Shortly after 11am, Hunter arrived at Stephen's Green and saw to organizing the Companies. At 11:45am, Major John MacBride arrived on the scene and asked MacDonagh if he could join in the fight. At around 11:50am, the 2nd Battalion were led out of Stephen's Green and marched the short distance to the Jacob's Biscuit Factory, a monolithic building with high towers dominating Dublin Castle, the seat of British administration in Ireland, on one side and the approach from Portobello Barracks from Rathmines on the other. At noon, the planned time for the start of the Rising, MacDonagh issued the order to enter the factory and evict any workers and to set about fortifying the structure.  At 2pm, Hunter and a small detachment were ordered to take and hold an outpost position at New Street and Fumbally Lane. After a few hours, this detachment was ordered back to the main body as it was determined that holding the position was untenable should it come under attack.

The garrison kept any British approach to the city from its area pinned down by sniping, and sent out groups to reconnoitre and supply other garrisons fighting in the College of Surgeons, Marrowbone Lane Distillery and the GPO. By midweek, communication with the GPO was severed. Pádraig Pearse and the GPO garrison retreated to Moore Street on Friday and surrendered that night in a city now occupied by 20,000 British troops. His order to the remaining fighters to surrender were delivered the following Sunday by two Franciscan priests.

Following the Rising, Hunter was sentenced to death – this was later commuted to penal servitude for life.

In 1917 Hunter, along with Éamon de Valera and Thomas Ashe, was recognised by his fellow prisoners at Lewes prison as one of their Commanding Officers. On 28 May of that year, de Valera, Ashe and Hunter lead a prison hunger-strike demanding to be treated as Prisoners of War and not regular criminals. This led the British authorities to remove the prisoners from Lewes to separate facilities. On 5 June, Hunter was moved to Maidstone Prison with de Valera, albeit in a separate car. By 18 June 1917, all participants of the Easter Rising had been released.

War of Independence
On the night of 17 May 1918, Hunter was again arrested, this time along with almost all the other members of the Sinn Féin leadership during the "German Plot". Warnings of this arrest were made by the fledgling information network set up by Michael Collins. While imprisoned at Gloucester Gaol, he contracted influenza. On 24 February 1919, he was moved to Gloucester City Infirmary for treatment and remained there until 6 March.

In the autumn of 1919, Hunter introduced Dan Breen to Liam Lynch, both of whom were on the run from the British authorities.

By March 1920, Hunter and his partner, Peadar Clancy, had established a drapery and tailoring business, "The Republican Outfitters", on Talbot Street in Dublin. Hunter was once again arrested, this time for his involvement in the theft of Lord Lieutenant French's documents. While incarcerated in Mountjoy Prison, Hunter and several others, including Clancy and Frank Gallagher, began a hunger-strike on 5 April, demanding to be treated as Prisoners of War. News of these hunger-strikes sparked general strikes called by the trade unions and large scale demonstrations in Dublin to show support for the hunger strikers. On 14 April 1920, all hunger striking prisoners were released, and Hunter was moved to Jervis Street Hospital. On 26 April, he was discharged as "improved". From this time until his death, his health continued to be in decline.

In October 1920, during a "wholesale raid" of the homes of Sinn Féin members, British troops attacked Hunter & Clancy's business, severely damaging the building. It was mistakenly reported at the time that Hunter was among the dead. The dead IRA officer was actually Seán Treacy.

Political career

In December 1918 he was elected as a Sinn Féin MP for the Cork North East constituency at the 1918 general election. Sinn Féin MPs refused to attend Westminster, and instead assembled at the Mansion House in Dublin as a revolutionary parliament called Dáil Éireann, though Hunter could not attend as he was still in prison for his supposed involvement in The German Plot.

In May 1921, Hunter was elected unopposed as a Sinn Féin Teachta Dála (TD) for the Cork East and North East constituency at the 1921 elections.

During Dáil debates on the Anglo-Irish Treaty, Hunter spoke (albeit briefly) against the treaty.

At the 1922 general election, Hunter stood unsuccessfully as an anti-Treaty Sinn Féin candidate.

Civil War
Hunter fought on the anti-Treaty side during the Irish Civil War and served as the Quartermaster for the Cork No. 2 Brigade areas.

Death
Hunter died at his farm in Glanworth, County Cork of heart disease on 11 March 1932 following a long and debilitating illness. He was survived by his widow Maire (née Kelleher), the local Primary School Principal, and their only child Conchubhair (Con) Colbert Hunter. It is supposed that his heart condition was the result of his participation in the hunger strikes.

Legacy
A stretch of the N72 (Mallow Road) leading to the village of Castletownroche has been named Commandant Tom Hunter Park.

References

1883 births
1932 deaths
Politicians from County Cork
Early Sinn Féin TDs
Members of the 1st Dáil
Members of the 2nd Dáil
Members of the Parliament of the United Kingdom for County Cork constituencies (1801–1922)
UK MPs 1918–1922
People of the Easter Rising
People of the Irish Civil War (Anti-Treaty side)
Irish Republican Army (1919–1922) members
Members of the Irish Republican Brotherhood
People of the Irish War of Independence
Prisoners sentenced to death by the United Kingdom
Irish hunger strikers